The Town of Bethune is a Statutory Town located in Kit Carson County, Colorado, United States. The town population was 183 at the 2020 United States Census.

Bethune has access with Interstate 70 and U.S. Highway 24.

Geography
Bethune is located at  (39.304471, -102.423362).

Demographics

According to the most recent Census Bureau demographics available, released in December 2018, Bethune has a population of 227, making it the 5th largest town or city in population out of 10 total in the area. The city with the highest population in the area is Burlington, with a population of 5,468. Burlington is the county seat of Kit Carson County.

From the census of 2000, there were 225 people, 74 households, and 58 families residing in Bethune. The racial makeup of the town was 73.78% White, 0.89% Native American, 0.44% Asian, 23.56% from other races, and 1.33% from two or more races. Hispanic or Latino of any race were 31.11% of the population.

There were 74 households, out of which 48.6% had children under the age of 18 living with them, 66.2% were married couples living together, 8.1% had a female householder with no husband present, and 21.6% were non-families. 20.3% of all households were made up of individuals, and 6.8% had someone living alone who was 65 years of age or older.  The average household size was 3.04 and the average family size was 3.50.

In the town, the population was spread out, with 35.6% under the age of 18, 11.6% from 18 to 24, 28.0% from 25 to 44, 17.3% from 45 to 64, and 7.6% who were 65 years of age or older.  The median age was 27 years. For every 100 females, there were 106.4 males.  For every 100 females age 18 and over, there were 101.4 males.

The median income for a household in the town was $28,958, and the median income for a family was $30,833. Males had a median income of $23,750 versus $16,250 for females. The per capita income for the town was $13,994.  About 21.9% of families and 27.8% of the population were below the poverty line, including 41.8% of those under the age of eighteen and none of those 65 or over.

Notable people
Notable individuals who were born in or have lived in Bethune include:
 Denver Pyle (1920-1997), actor

See also

 List of municipalities in Colorado

References

External links

 CDOT map of the Town of Bethune

Towns in Kit Carson County, Colorado
Towns in Colorado